Kaoa (Rarotongan: kāoa, literally meaning 'coral rock in the lagoon') is a term used in three atolls of the Cook Islands for small coral rocky outcrops that are the base for pearl farming.
The three atolls, with their respective Kaoa areas, are:
Penrhyn (15.0 km2)
Manihiki (5.0 km2)
Rakahanga (1.6 km2)

References

Atolls of the Cook Islands
Manihiki
Rakahanga
Penrhyn atoll